Suika  may refer to:
 Arūnas Šuika (born 1970), Lithuanian international footballer
 Suika (visual novel), by Circus
 Suika (TV series), a 2003 TV show
 Suika (Dr. Stone), a character in the manga series Dr. Stone
 Suika Ibuki, a character in the Touhou Project series of games

See also
 Suica, a Japanese contactless smart card
Suikawari, a Japanese game involving watermelons